Hrad (The Lake) is a Bengali drama film directed by Ardhendu Sen. The film starring Uttam Kumar, Sandhya Rani, Chabi Biswas, Asit Baran. This film was released on 29 July 1955 under the banner of Rupmaya films. The story was based on Bimal Kar's novel of same name. The film showed Uttam's one of the most different and critical character where he played a memory lost patient and give one of the finest performance in his entire career. The famous composer Manabendra Mukhopadhyay was the music director of the film. The film became moderate success at the box office.

Plot

Cast
 Uttam Kumar
 Chhabi Biswas
 Jahor Roy
 Sandhyarani
 Asit Baran
 Tarun Kumar Chatterjee
 Premangshu Bose
 Sital Bandopadhyay
 Ashu Bose
 Suprabha Mukhopadhyay

Soundtrack

Award
1955 - BFJA Best Actor - Uttam Kumar

References

1955 films
Films scored by Manabendra Mukhopadhyay
Bengali-language Indian films
1950s Bengali-language films
Indian drama films
1955 drama films

External links